Naqenj (also known as Nāghuni and Naqūnī) is a village in Alqurat Rural District, in the Central District of Birjand County, South Khorasan Province, Iran. At the 2006 census, its population was 562, in 147 families.

References 

Populated places in Birjand County